A list of national trade union centers in Italy include:

Trade union centers

Main national trade union centers
The following three confederal trade unions are considered and recognised by the Italian Republic as relevant counterpart:
 Italian General Confederation of Labour (CGIL)
 Italian Confederation of Workers' Trade Unions (CISL)
 Italian Labour Union (UIL)

Other union centers
A list of other minor sectorial or independent trade union centers includes (alphabetical order):

 Confederazione del Comitati di Base (COBAS)
 CONFSAL
 General Labour Union (UGL)
 Italian Confederation of Free Workers' Unions (CISAL)
 Unione Sindacale di Base (USB)
 Unione Sindacale Italiana (USI)

Trade unions
An incomplete list of sectorial trade unions includes (alphabetical order):

DIRFOR
Italian Footballers' Association
UILCA

Structure 

Italian unions are built around local chambers of labor (camera del lavoro). These chambers largely do not collectively bargain but serve as the clearinghouse for Italian worker assistance, as opposed to other countries, where workers might first appeal to a national union. Workers organize around these chambers rather than at worksites. Italian unions are loose affiliations based on occupation.

References

External links

  CGIL official website
  CISL official website
  UIL official website

Trade unions
Italy